The 2010 Metro Atlantic Athletic Conference men's basketball tournament will take place from March 5–8, 2010 at the Times Union Center in Albany, New York.  The winner will be crowned with the Metro Atlantic Athletic Conference championship and its automatic bid into the 2010 NCAA tournament.

Bracket

* denotes overtime game

2009–10 Metro Atlantic Athletic Conference men's basketball season
MAAC men's basketball tournament
College basketball tournaments in New York (state)
Basketball competitions in Albany, New York
MAAC men's basketball tournament
MAAC men's basketball tournament